Renée Camu (born 12 March 1936) is a French rower. Between 1963 and 1968 she won three silver medals in single sculls at the European championships. She then changed to double sculls and won a bronze medal in 1972, placing fourth in 1971 and sixth in 1973. She semi-retired in 1980, but in 1999 resumed competing in the masters category and won several world titles in the 2000s.

References

1936 births
Living people
French female rowers
European Rowing Championships medalists
20th-century French women
21st-century French women